Alistair Abell is a Canadian actor, producer and director who works in Vancouver, British Columbia, Canada. He has voiced several roles in anime, most notably Colin MacLeod in Highlander: The Search for Vengeance and Lord Djibril in Gundam Seed Destiny. He has also worked in video games such as Electronic Arts' SSX 3, and SSX On Tour (Psymon Stark).

Filmography

Live
Batwoman (TV series)  (TV) as Mason (Season 3 Episode 2 Loose Tooth)
Freddy vs. Jason as Officer Goodman
His and Her Christmas (TV movie)
The New Addams Family (TV) as Stanley
Stargate SG-1 (TV) as Jayem Seran (Season 10, Episode 16)

Voice-acting
.hack//Roots (TV) as Sakisaka
007 Racing (VG) as Georgi Koskov
Boys Over Flowers (TV) as Akira Mimiasaka
Barbie and the Three Musketeers as Musketeer #1 / Royal Announcer
Barbie in A Mermaid Tale as Remo / Pufferazzi
Barbie in A Mermaid Tale 2 as Remo / Pufferazzi / Surfer Alistair
Barbie Mariposa as Lord Gastrous
Black Lagoon (TV) as Luak
Bratz: Super Babyz as The Store Manager
The Daichis - Earth Defence Family (TV) as Public Announcer, Fighter Pilot
Death Note - Shawn Dunleavy / Ill Ratt, Student (Episode 9)
Def Jam Vendetta (VG) as Additional Voices
Diary of a Wimpy Kid as Reporter
Dragon Ball Z (TV) as Teen/Future Trunks (Vancouver dub); Sharpner (Vancouver dub)
Dragon Drive (TV) as Yakou
Dynasty Warriors: Gundam 2 (VG) as Astonaige Medoz (English version)
Elemental Gelade as Lieutenant Cruz
Galaxy Angel (TV)
Galaxy Angel Z (TV) as Bully; Patrick
G.I. Joe: Valor vs. Venom as Ace
Highlander: The Search for Vengeance (movie) as Colin MacLeod
Human Crossing (TV) as Chef; Yoshi
Inuyasha (TV) as Hakkaku
Inuyasha: The Final Act (TV) as Hakkaku, Kinka, Kāo (the Flower Prince in English)
Iron Man: Armored Adventures (TV) as Happy Hogan, Black Knight
Marvel Nemesis: Rise of the Imperfects (VG) as Spider-Man
Mary-Kate and Ashley in Action! (TV) as Additional Voices
Mobile Suit Gundam Seed Destiny (TV) as Lord Djibril
Mobile Suit Gundam 00 (TV) as Ming, Klaus Grad
Ranma ½ as Sotatsu
Santa Mouse and the Ratdeer as Lousy
Sausage Party as Mariachi Salsa, Gelfite Fish
Shakugan no Shana (TV) as Eita Tanaka (Season 1)
SSX on Tour (VG) as Psymon
Star Ocean EX (TV) as Dr. Bowman Jean
The Little Prince (2010) (TV) as Shin-Joh (episodes 3 and 4, B 311, the Planet of the Firebird)
Thor: Tales of Asgard as Fandral
Transformers: Energon (TV) as Prowl

Producer
The Little Things
Road Kill
Sol Goode
Swap

Voice Director
Dead Rising 2: Case 0 (VG)
Dead Rising 2: Case West (VG)
Dead Rising 2: Off the Record (VG)
Puzzle Fighter

Casting Director
Marley & Me: The Puppy Years

Walla Group:
Black Light
The Charlie Da Clown Show
Dead Rising: Watchtower

Special Thanks:
At Lunchtime: A Story of Love
The Beast of Bottomless Lake
Pits
Taming Tammy

External links

Alistair Abell at CrystalAcids.com

Living people
Canadian casting directors
Film producers from Manitoba
Canadian male film actors
Canadian male television actors
Canadian male voice actors
Male actors from Manitoba
Canadian voice directors
20th-century Canadian male actors
21st-century Canadian male actors
Year of birth missing (living people)